Hassan Yebda (born 14 May 1984) is a former professional footballer who played as a central midfielder.

During his professional career, he played in France, Portugal, England, Italy and Spain, representing a host of clubs.

Yebda appeared for France at youth level, but opted to play for Algeria as a senior in August 2009, taking advantage of FIFA's new ruling which allowed him to change his national allegiance despite being older than 21 years of age. He represented the latter national team in two World Cups and the 2010 Africa Cup of Nations.

Club career

France
Born in Saint-Maurice, Val-de-Marne, Yebda emerged through AJ Auxerre's youth system, but made no appearances for the first team during his stint, playing regularly for the reserves in the Championnat de France amateur.

In January 2006, he was loaned to Ligue 2's Stade Lavallois. In the same month of the following year, Yebda was definitely released and moved to Le Mans UC72, making his Ligue 1 debut on 17 February 2007 in a 2–0 away loss against Sochaux. Brought on in the 70th minute, he scored an own goal ten minutes later, in his only appearance of the season.

Benfica
In 2007–08, Yebda appeared regularly for Le Mans, helping the team achieve a comfortable ninth place in the league. On 29 May 2008, he signed a four-year contract with S.L. Benfica on a free transfer. A constant midfield fixture, he was voted the Primeira Liga's Player of the Month in September and, in February 2009, he netted his first league goal for the Lisbon club in a 1–1 league draw at FC Porto.

Yebda made a move to Premier League side Portsmouth on 1 September 2009, on a season-long loan. He scored his first goal on 3 October, against Wolverhampton Wanderers at Molineux Stadium, which was the winner in their first victory of the campaign; his second came in a 2–1 away win against Burnley on 27 February 2010, with Pompey being eventually relegated.
 
On 27 August 2010, Yebda was again loaned, joining S.S.C. Napoli in a season-long move. He netted his first goal the following 18 January, in a 2–1 home win against Bologna for the Coppa Italia; on 4 July 2011, the player announced that he would not be returning to the Serie A team.

Granada
On 22 August 2011, Yebda joined Granada CF in Spain, signing a three-year contract. He made his official debut five days later, coming as a second-half substitute in a 1–0 La Liga home loss against Real Betis.

Yebda's spell in Andalusia was greatly undermined by injury problems.

Later years
On 15 August 2014, Yebda signed a one-year deal with UAE Arabian Gulf League side Fujairah FC. On 2 July 2016, after one year without a club, the 32-year-old returned to Portugal and joined C.F. Os Belenenses for one season.

International career
Yebda represented France at youth levels, being part of the squad at the victorious 2001 FIFA U-17 World Championship tournament held in Trinidad and Tobago. As a senior, however, he switched allegiances to Algeria, first being picked for a match against Zambia in September 2009, where he did not play; he finally made his debut on 11 October, in a 3–1 win over Rwanda for the 2010 FIFA World Cup qualifiers.

Yebda was summoned for the Algerian squad at the 2010 Africa Cup of Nations, playing (and starting) all the matches for the eventual semi-finalists. In June, he was selected to the FIFA World Cup in South Africa, again playing all the games: during the tournament he partnered Mehdi Lacen (another defensive midfielder) as the national team failed to score a goal, earning one point.

On 27 March 2011, Yebda scored his first goal for Algeria, in a 1–0 win against Morocco for the 2012 Africa Cup of Nations qualifier where he netted in the sixth minute from a penalty kick. He was also selected to the 2014 World Cup by coach Vahid Halilhodžić, and featured 19 minutes in the last group stage match against Russia to help his team hold on to the 1–1 draw and reach the last 16.

Personal life
Yebda was born to a family from the village of Taourirt Adène in the Tizi Ouzou Province in the Kabylie region of Algeria. He understands both Kabyle and Arabic, but does not speak either language fluently.

Career statistics

Club

International
Scores and results list Algeria's goal tally first, score column indicates score after each Yebda goal.

Honours
Benfica
Taça da Liga: 2008–09

Portsmouth
FA Cup runner-up: 2009–10

France U 17
FIFA U-17 World Cup: 2001

Individual
SJPF Player of the Month: September 2008

References

External links
 
 
 
 
 
 
 

1984 births
Living people
People from Saint-Maurice, Val-de-Marne
Footballers from Val-de-Marne
French sportspeople of Algerian descent
French people of Kabyle descent
Kabyle people
French footballers
Algerian footballers
Association football midfielders
Ligue 1 players
Ligue 2 players
AJ Auxerre players
Stade Lavallois players
Le Mans FC players
Primeira Liga players
S.L. Benfica footballers
C.F. Os Belenenses players
Premier League players
Portsmouth F.C. players
Serie A players
S.S.C. Napoli players
Udinese Calcio players
La Liga players
Granada CF footballers
UAE Pro League players
Fujairah FC players
France youth international footballers
Algeria international footballers
2010 Africa Cup of Nations players
2010 FIFA World Cup players
2014 FIFA World Cup players
Algerian expatriate footballers
Algerian expatriate sportspeople in Portugal
French expatriate sportspeople in Portugal
Expatriate footballers in Portugal
Algerian expatriate sportspeople in England
French expatriate sportspeople in England
Expatriate footballers in England
Algerian expatriate sportspeople in Italy
French expatriate sportspeople in Italy
Expatriate footballers in Italy
Algerian expatriate sportspeople in Spain
French expatriate sportspeople in Spain
Expatriate footballers in Spain
Algerian expatriate sportspeople in the United Arab Emirates
French expatriate sportspeople in the United Arab Emirates
Expatriate footballers in the United Arab Emirates